The 2009–10 Primeira Liga (also known as the Liga Sagres for sponsorship reasons) was the 76th season of the Primeira Liga, the top professional league for Portuguese association football clubs. It began on 16 August 2009 and ended on 9 May 2010.

Benfica won their 32nd league title after a 2–1 home victory over Rio Ave on the last matchday. Benfica striker Óscar Cardozo was the top scorer with 26 goals.

Changes from 2008–09

Team changes
Trofense have been relegated to the Liga de Honra after finishing the 2008–09 season in 16th and last place. Trofense were to be accompanied by Belenenses, who finished in 15th place. Belenenses were ending a ten-year stretch in the Portuguese top-level league, while Trofense returned to the Liga da Honra after just one year in the top flight.

Estrela da Amadora, however, who finished last season in 11th place, have been relegated for economic problems to the Liga Vitalis. Therefore, Belenenses' relegation has been reversed and they will participate in the Liga Sagres once more.

The relegated teams were replaced by Liga Vitalis 2008–09 champions Olhanense and runners-up União de Leiria. Olhanense returned to the top-flight after 34 years, while Leiria was back after a one-year hiatus.

Structural changes
Based on UEFA coefficients, Portugal finished in tenth place of the UEFA country ranking after the 2008–09 season. As a result, the Portuguese league will lose one qualification spot for the 2010–11 UEFA Europa League. The third-placed team will now qualify for the third qualification round instead of the play-off round. The fourth-placed team will enter the competition in the second qualification round while the fifth place will not initially qualify for any European competitions via league placement. However, this may change during the course of the season depending on the league performance of both 2009–10 Cup of Portugal finalists.

Team overview

Stadia and locations

Personnel and sponsoring

Managerial changes

1 Interim coach

League table

Positions by round

Results

Season statistics

Top goalscorers

Source: Liga Sagres – Top Goalscorers (Portuguese)

Top assists

Source: Liga Sagres – Top Assists (Portuguese)

Own goals

Source: Liga Sagres – Own goals (Portuguese)

Awards

Monthly awards

SJPF Player of the Month

SJPF Young Player of the Month

SJPF Fair Play Award

Annual awards

LPFP Primeira Liga Player of the Year 
The LPFP Primeira Liga Player of the Year was awarded to David Luiz of Benfica.

LPFP Primeira Liga Breakthrough Player of the Year 
The LPFP Primeira Liga Breakthrough Player of the Year was awarded to Fábio Coentrão of Benfica.

LPFP Primeira Liga Manager of the Year 
The LPFP Primeira Liga Manager of the Year was awarded to Jorge Jesus of Benfica.

LPFP Primeira Liga Breakthrough Manager of the Year 
The LPFP Primeira Liga Breakthrough Manager of the Year was awarded to André Villas-Boas of Académica.

See also
 2009–10 Liga de Honra
 2009–10 Taça de Portugal
 2009–10 Taça da Liga
 List of 2009–10 Portuguese Liga transfers

References

External links
Official webpage (Portuguese)
Official regulation (Portuguese)
Official Statistics (Portuguese)

Primeira Liga seasons
Port
1